Sir Stephen Robert Silber (born 26 March 1944) is a retired British judge of the High Court of England and Wales.

Legal career
Silber was called to the bar at Gray's Inn in 1968 and made a bencher in 1994. In 1987, he became a Queen's Counsel and in the same year appointed a Recorder, qualifying as a Deputy High Court judge from 1995 to 1999. He was a member of the Criminal Law Committee of the Judicial Studies Board (now the Judicial College) and a member of the Law Commission from 1994 to 1999. On 3 December 1999, he was appointed to the High Court of England and Wales, receiving the customary knighthood, and assigned to the Queen's Bench Division. Since 2004, he has served as a member of the Employment Appeal Tribunal. He has an MPhil from Oxford University, where he is an Honorary Fellow.

References

1944 births
Living people
Alumni of University College London
Alumni of Trinity College, Cambridge
21st-century English judges
Queen's Bench Division judges
Members of Gray's Inn
Knights Bachelor
20th-century English judges